Hatakeyama (written: 畠山 or 畑山) is a Japanese surname. Notable people with the surname include:

, Japanese rhythmic gymnast
, Japanese electronic musician
, Japanese baseball player
, Japanese rugby union player
, Japanese shogi player
, Japanese Founder of Ebara Pumps
, Japanese daimyō
, Japanese photographer
, Japanese shogi player
, Japanese journalist
, Japanese samurai
, Japanese samurai
, Japanese boxer
, Japanese daimyō
, Japanese samurai
, Japanese samurai
, Japanese daimyō

See also
Hatakeyama clan
9114 Hatakeyama, a main-belt minor planet

Japanese-language surnames